Fred W. Glover (born March 8, 1937 in Kansas City, Missouri) is known for his contributions to the area of metaheuristics (a name he coined) and for launching the computer-based optimization methodology of Tabu search and the associated evolutionary  Scatter Search and Path Relinking algorithms. Glover's principal areas of research include the fields of analytics, artificial intelligence, machine learning and applied mathematics.

Education
He received his Ph.D. in Operations Research in 1965 under Gerald L. Thompson at Carnegie Mellon University and was a Post-doctoral Research Fellow with the Miller Research Institute at the University of California, Berkeley, associated with George Dantzig's Center of Operations Research.

Work
Fred Glover is Distinguished Professor, Emeritus, at the University of Colorado, Boulder, associated with the College of Engineering and Applied Science, the Applied Mathematics Department and the Leeds School of Business. He also serves as the Chief Technology Officer in charge of algorithm design and strategic planning initiatives for OptTek Systems, Inc., a provider of optimization software to the simulation industry. He has authored or co-authored more than 450 published articles and eight books in the fields of mathematical optimization, computer science and artificial intelligence.

Research
Glover's principal areas of research including: applications of computers to the fields of optimization, applied artificial intelligence, systems design, multicriteria analysis, decision support, logistics, natural resources planning, large scale allocation models, transportation, financial analysis and industrial planning.

References

External links
 OptTek website
 Biography of Fred Glover from the Institute for Operations Research and the Management Sciences
  Fred Glover's home page with vita and publications

American computer scientists
University of Missouri alumni
Carnegie Mellon University alumni
Living people
Members of the United States National Academy of Engineering
1937 births
American chief technology officers
John von Neumann Theory Prize winners
Fellows of the Institute for Operations Research and the Management Sciences